Alias Betty is a 2001 French drama film directed by Claude Miller.

The film won several international film festival awards. On Rotten Tomatoes it has an approval rating of 92% based on 51 reviews.

Cast 
 Sandrine Kiberlain - Betty Fisher
 Nicole Garcia - Margot Fisher
 Mathilde Seigner - Carole Novacki
 Luck Mervil - François Diembele
 Édouard Baer - Alex Basato
 Béatrice Agenin - Alex's mistress
 Stéphane Freiss - Edouard
 Yves Jacques - René the Canadian
 Roschdy Zem - Dr. Jerome Castang
 Consuelo De Haviland - Madame Barsky
 Yves Verhoeven - Martinaud
 Michaël Abiteboul - Milo
 Samir Guesmi - Inspector

References

External links 
 

2001 films
2001 drama films
Films directed by Claude Miller
Films based on British novels
French drama films
2000s French-language films
2000s French films